Nebria commixta is a species of black coloured ground beetle from Nebriinae subfamily that can be found in Armenia, Georgia, and Russia.

References

commixta
Beetles described in 1850
Beetles of Asia